Syrnola bifasciata, common name the two-banded pyramid shell,  is a species of sea snail, a marine gastropod mollusk in the family Pyramidellidae, the pyrams and their allies.

Description
The length of the shell measures 6 mm.

Distribution
The type specimen of this marine species was found off Tasmania. It is also endemic to New South Wales and Victoria, Australia.

References

External links
 To World Register of Marine Species
 A guide to the seashells and other marine molluks of Tasmania : Syrnola bifasciata

Pyramidellidae
Gastropods described in 1875